Travis Cotton  (born 18 May 1975) is an Australian actor and playwright. He studied acting at the Western Australian Academy of Performing Arts.

Film & Television Credits
 The Jesters (2009–2010) (TV) - Tony Coggan
 My Year Without Sex (2009) - Howard
 Rush (2008) -(TV) Jeremy
 Monster House (2008) (TV) - Jack Webb
 Satisfaction (2008) (TV) - Bobby Brooks
 Kick (2007) (TV) - John
 Bastard Boys (2007) (TV) - The Feral
 In A Pickle (2005) - Johnny
 Right Here, Right Now (2004) - Simon
 Blue Heelers (2003) (TV) - Bart Purdy
 Blurred (2002) - Wayne
 Always Greener (2003) (TV) - Darren Nieuwenhutzen
 Neighbours (2022) (TV) - Dean Covey

Awards
 2005 Naked Theatre Company Award Best Writer of a Short Play, God, the Devil and the True History of Mankind
 2003 Naked Theatre Company Award Best Writer of a Short Play, The 5th at Randwick
 2001 Equity Guild Awards Best Newcomer, Away

References

External links

Australian male actors
Living people
1975 births